The Soviet Union women's national volleyball team was the national volleyball team that had represented the Soviet Union in the International competitions between 1952 until 1991.

FIVB considers Russia as the inheritor of the records of Soviet Union (1952–1991) and CIS (1992).
The USSR Volleyball Federation joined the FIVB in 1948, a year after the foundation of the international governing body. In 1952, they triumphed in the first ever FIVB Women’s World Championship and have been dominating the international scene ever since, having won Four Summer Olympics, Five World Championships, one World Cup and 13 European Championships.

History
The USSR Volleyball Federation joined the FIVB in 1948 and in 1952 they sent a team to compete in the first ever World Championship.
They were soon regularly topping the podium at international competitions such as the Olympic Games, World Championship and European Championships and the World Cup.

Major world titles

USSR

# – 4 major titles in row in late 1960s - early 1970s (World Women's Volleyball Championship, World Cup, Olympic Games)

Results

Olympic Games

 1964 –  Silver Medal
 1968 –  Gold Medal
 1972 –  Gold Medal
 1976 –  Silver Medal
 1980 –  Gold Medal
 1988 –  Gold Medal

Unified Team
 1992 –  Silver Medal

FIVB World Championship

 1952 –  Gold Medal
 1956 –  Gold Medal
 1960 –  Gold Medal
 1962 –  Silver Medal
 1970 –  Gold Medal
 1974 –  Silver Medal
 1978 –  Bronze Medal
 1982 – 6th place
 1986 – 6th place
 1990 –  Gold Medal

FIVB World Cup

1973 –  Gold Medal
1977 – 7th place (tied)
1981 –   Bronze Medal
1985 –  Bronze Medal
1989 –  Silver Medal
1991 –  Bronze Medal

European Championship

 1949 –  Gold Medal
 1950 –  Gold Medal
 1951 –  Gold Medal
 1955 –  Silver Medal
 1958 –  Gold Medal
 1963 –  Gold Medal
 1967 –  Gold Medal
 1971 –  Gold Medal
 1975 –  Gold Medal
 1977 –  Gold Medal
 1979 –  Gold Medal
 1981 –  Silver Medal
 1983 –  Silver Medal
 1985 –  Gold Medal
 1987 –  Silver Medal
 1989 –  Gold Medal
 1991 –  Gold Medal

Team

1990 Last World Championship squad 
Coach: Nikolay Karpol

References

External links

Official website
FIVB profile

Soviet Union women
Women's
World champion national volleyball teams